Dick Finnigan  ( – ) was a Welsh international footballer goalkeeper. He was part of the Wales national football team, playing 1 match on 1 February 1930 against Ireland. At club level, he played for Manchester City in 1926, playing eight matches and also played for Wrexham.

See also
 List of Wales international footballers (alphabetical)

References

1904 births
Welsh footballers
Wales international footballers
Manchester City F.C. players
Wrexham A.F.C. players
Place of birth missing
Date of death missing
Association football goalkeepers